The 2004 Carroll Fighting Saints football team was an American football team that represented Carroll College as a member of the Frontier Conference during the 2004 NAIA football season. In their sixth season under head coach Mike Van Diest, the Saints compiled a perfect 12–2 record (6–2 against conference opponents) and won the NAIA national championship, defeating Saint Francis (Indiana), 15–13, in the NAIA National Championship Game.

The team was led on offense by junior quarterback Tyler Emmert. Emmert received the NAIA Football Player of the Year Award in both 2003 and 2005.

Schedule

References

Carroll
Carroll Fighting Saints football seasons
NAIA Football National Champions
Carroll Fighting Saints football